Andre Petroski (born June 12, 1991) is an American mixed martial artist who competes in the Middleweight division of the Ultimate Fighting Championship.

Background
Having wrestled since he was four years old, Petroski was a three-time state qualifier at Springfield High School. He then attended University of North Carolina at Chapel Hill with full wrestling scholarship for two years, transferred to Bloomsburg University of Pennsylvania and finalized his college career in Kutztown University of Pennsylvania, majoring in communications. While waiting for graduation, Petroski started training Brazilian jiu-jitsu and fell in love with the art.

Petroski battled a heroin addiction, before going clean in 2018.

Mixed martial arts career

Early career
Petroski started training mixed martial arts in late 2015, took his first amateur bout in the following January and eventually turned pro in 2018. Making his professional debut at Art Of War Cage Fighting 8,  Petroski faced Mark Krumine and went on win the bout via TKO in the first round. After winning his next two bout via first round submission, at Art Of War Cage Fighting 15, he faced Shedrick Goodridge for the AOW Middleweight Championship, winning via TKO in the second round. Petroski defended his title once against Andre Hall at AOW 16, before headlining LFA 93 against Aaron Jeffrey. He lost the first bout of his professional career, getting finished late in the second round.

Racking up a 5–1 record with a regional championship, Petroski was announced to be participating The Ultimate Fighter season 29 middleweight tournament.

The Ultimate Fighter
Petroski faced Aaron Phillips in the quarterfinal round, advancing to semifinals via first-round submission. In the semifinals Petroski was submitted in the second round by Bryan Battle and was eliminated from the tournament.

Ultimate Fighting Championship
Despite being eliminated from The Ultimate Fighter, Petroski was signed to the UFC and made his debut against fellow TUF alum Micheal Gillmore at UFC on ESPN: Barboza vs. Chikadze on August 28, 2021. He won the bout via third-round technical knockout.

Replacing Alen Amedovski on short notice, Petroski faced Hu Yaozong at UFC 267 on October 30, 2021. He won the bout at the end of the third round via arm-triangle choke.

Petroski faced Nick Maximov at UFC on ESPN: Błachowicz vs. Rakić on May 14, 2022. Petroski won the bout after choking out Maximov in the first round via an anaconda choke submission.

Petroski faced Wellington Turman on November 12, 2022, at UFC 281. He won the fight via unanimous decision.

Petroski is scheduled to face Armen Petrosya on May 6, 2023, at UFC 288.

Personal life
Petroski has a daughter.
He has a tattoo of a hammer and sickle which pays homage to his great grandfather who hailed from the Soviet Union. He has stated that he's not a communist and that the hammer and sickle once had a different meaning before the symbol was appropriated by communists.

Championships and accomplishments
Art of War Cage Fighting
AOW Middleweight Championship (one time; former)
One successful title defense

Mixed martial arts record

|-
|Win
|align=center|9–1
|Wellington Turman
|Decision (unanimous)
|UFC 281
|
|align=center|3
|align=center|5:00
|New York City, New York, United States
|
|-
|Win
|align=center|8–1
|Nick Maximov
|Technical Submission (anaconda choke)
|UFC on ESPN: Błachowicz vs. Rakić
|
|align=center|1
|align=center|1:16
|Las Vegas, Nevada, United States
|
|-
|Win
|align=center|7–1
|Hu Yaozong
|Submission (arm-triangle choke)
|UFC 267
|
|align=center|3
|align=center|4:46
|Abu Dhabi, United Arab Emirates
|
|-
|Win
|align=center|6–1
|Micheal Gillmore
|TKO (punches and elbows)
|UFC on ESPN: Barboza vs. Chikadze
|
|align=center|3
|align=center|3:12
|Las Vegas, Nevada, United States
|
|-
|Loss
|align=center|5–1
|Aaron Jeffery
|TKO (knees and punches)
|LFA 93
|
|align=center|2
|align=center|4:19
|Park City, Kansas, United States
|
|-
|Win
|align=center|5–0
|Andre Hall
|TKO (punches)
|Art of War Cage Fighting 16
|
|align=center|2
|align=center|3:37
|Philadelphia, Pennsylvania, United States
|
|-
|Win
|align=center|4–0
|Shedrick Goodridge
|TKO (punches)
|Art of War Cage Fighting 15
|
|align=center|2
|align=center|5:00
|Philadelphia, Pennsylvania, United States
|
|-
|Win
|align=center|3–0
|Jesse James
|Submission (kimura)
|Art of War Cage Fighting 13
|
|align=center|1
|align=center|3:34
|Philadelphia, Pennsylvania, United States
|
|-
|Win
|align=center|2–0
|Ryan Parker
|Submission
|Art of War Cage Fighting 12
|
|align=center|1
|align=center|1:56
|Philadelphia, Pennsylvania, United States
|
|-
|Win
|align=center|1–0
|Mark Krumrine
|TKO (punches)
|Art of War Cage Fighting 8
|
|align=center|1
|align=center|4:40
|Philadelphia, Pennsylvania, United States
|

Mixed martial arts exhibition record

|-
|Loss
|align=center|1–1
|Bryan Battle
|Submission (ninja choke)
| rowspan=2| The Return of The Ultimate Fighter: Team Volkanovski vs. Team Ortega
| (airdate)
|align=center|2
|align=center|2:05
| rowspan=2|Las Vegas, Nevada, United States
|
|-
|Win
|align=center|1–0
|Aaron Phillips
|Submission (guillotine choke) 
| (airdate)
|align=center|1
| align=center|4:42
|

See also 
 List of current UFC fighters
 List of male mixed martial artists

References

External links 
  
  

1991 births
Living people
American male mixed martial artists
Middleweight mixed martial artists
Mixed martial artists utilizing wrestling
Mixed martial artists utilizing Brazilian jiu-jitsu
Ultimate Fighting Championship male fighters
American male sport wrestlers
Amateur wrestlers
American practitioners of Brazilian jiu-jitsu